Machimia sejunctella is a moth in the family Depressariidae. It was described by Francis Walker in 1864. It is found in Brazil.

Adults are fawn coloured, the forewings with a broad darker fawn-coloured band and an elongated submarginal spot of the same colour. The hindwings are blackish.

References

Moths described in 1864
Machimia